Fe, Fi, Fo, Fum, and Phooey were five mice who traveled to the Moon and circled it 75 times on the 1972 Apollo 17 mission. NASA gave them identification numbers A3305, A3326, A3352, A3356, and A3400, and their nicknames were given by the Apollo 17 crew, Eugene Cernan, Harrison Schmitt, and Ronald Evans. The four male mice, one female mouse, and Evans orbited the Moon for a record-setting six days and four hours in the Apollo command module America as Cernan and Schmitt performed the Apollo program's last lunar excursions. 

One of the male mice died (A-3352) during the trip, and the four survivors were euthanized and dissected for their intended biological information upon their return from the Moon.

The three astronauts and the five mice were the last Earthlings to travel to and orbit the Moon. Evans and the five mice share two living-being spaceflight records: the longest amount of time spent in lunar orbit (147 hours 43 minutes), and the most lunar orbits traveled (75).

Mission
Apollo 17 launched December 7, 1972, and returned to Earth on December 19. A biological cosmic ray experiment (BIOCORE) carried the five pocket mice (Perognathus longimembris), a species chosen for the experiment because they had well documented biological responses. Some advantages of the species included their small size, ease of maintenance in an isolated state (requiring no drinking water for the expected duration of the mission and producing highly concentrated waste), and their proven capability of withstanding environmental stress.

Fe, Fi, Fo, Fum, and Phooey had been implanted with radiation monitors under their scalps to see whether they would suffer damage from cosmic rays. Four of the five mice survived the flight; the cause of death of the fifth was not determined.

After their return to Earth, the four remaining live mice were euthanized and dissected. Although lesions in the scalp and liver were detected they appeared to be unrelated to one another, and were not thought to be the result of cosmic rays. No damage was found in the mice's retinas or viscera. At the time of the publication of the Apollo 17 Preliminary Science Report the mice's brains had not yet been examined, but subsequent studies showed no significant effect on their brains.

Gallery

See also
 Animals in space 
 Zond 5, a Soviet space program circumlunar voyage in September 1968, by two tortoises and assorted small plants and insects. They were the first and only other non-humans to fly to the vicinity of the Moon.
 Fee-fi-fo-fum, the namesake portion of the English fairy tale "Jack and the Beanstalk"

References

External links
 Space exchange, October, 2020
 Unilad article, April 28, 2021


Apollo 17
Animals in space
Mice
Perognathus
Individual animals in the United States
Individual mice
Cosmic-ray experiments
Space science experiments
Ronald Evans (astronaut)
Animal testing in the United States
Animal deaths by euthanasia
1972 in spaceflight
Laboratory mice